The Veliko Tarnovo Province Football League (Bulgarian: Областна футболна група Велико Търново) is a Bulgarian league for men's association football clubs in Veliko Tarnovo Province.

History 
The first Competition for amateur football teams in Veliko Tarnovo Province were held in the middle of 50s years of 20th century. In the next competition teams from little town and villages in Veliko Tarnovo Province take part in the tournament. The team of Dichin wins the Veliko Tarnovo Province Football League cup in 1954. Winner in 1958 is the team from the village Klimentovo, Veliko Tarnovo Province defeating the Vodoley team with 1:0. The matches from the tournament were played on stadium Kolodruma in Veliko Tarnovo. Next year in the town were held Cup of the Soviet Army. Participating teams from the region. The team from Ledenik wins the cup.

Season 1979/1980 Results

1979/1980

Professional group

"B" East

"B" west

Champions

Champions "A" grupa

Football teams 2016/2017

Veliko Tarnovo Province Football League"North" 
 FC Svetkavitsa Mihaltsy
 FC Udar Byala Cherkva
 FC Nedan Nedan
 FC Strala Orash
 FC Morava 
 FC Sportist Varbovka
 FC Ovcha mogila Ovcha mogila
 FC Ustrem Maslarevo
 FC Benkovski Balgarsko Slivovo
 FC Budeshte 
 FC Dunav Vardim
 FC Dimcha Dimcha

Veliko Tarnovo Province Football League"South" 
 FC Dolna Oryahovitsa Dolna Oryahovitsa
 FC Vladislav Dzhulyunitsa
 FC Parvomaytsi Parvomaytsi
 FC Draganovo Draganovo, Veliko Tarnovo Province
 FC Sportist Kozarevets
 FC Pobeda Kesarevo
 FC Rudanovski Konstantin
 FC Rositsa Polikrayshte
 FC Unak Merdanya
 FC Vihar Dobri dyal

Veliko Tarnovo Province Football League exteams 
 FC Spartak Polski Senovets
 FC CSKA Vishovgrad
 FC Vihar Hadzhidimitrovo (village)
 FC Udar Petko Karavelovo
 FC Vihar Radanovo
 FC Strela Obedinenie

References 

 Ангел Ганцаров "100 години футбол във Велико Търново" "100 Years Football in Veliko Tarnovo Province"
 Newspaper Borba – Veliko Tarnovo(1958–1980)
 State archive Veliko Tarnovo Found:1814
1